The Mixed individual time trial CP 1/CP 2 at the 2008 Summer Paralympics took place on September 12 at the Changping Triathlon Venue.

References

Cycling at the 2008 Summer Paralympics